Alabama House of Representatives, District 2 is one of 105 districts in the Alabama House of Representatives. Its current representative is Lynn Greer. The district was created in 1966 and encompasses parts of Lauderdale and Limestone counties.

Representatives
Source=

General Elections
Source=

References

02
1967 establishments in Alabama